Mercan Ezgi Mola (born 29 March 1983) is a Turkish actress who acted in several prominent Turkish movies and TV series.

Biography
Ezgi is known for her successful run in the cinema as well as theatre in her career.  She has performed in an improvisation theater "Arkadaşım Hoşgeldin". While studying at Akademi İstanbul, she made her debut in Kartal Tibet's Karate Can. She studied at Müjdat Gezen Arts Center for 4 years under Aydoğan Temel and also appeared first in his play Çürük Elma. In 2005, she joined BKM Theatre and appeared alongside Ugur Yücel in the series Hırsız Polis and "Canım Ailem". She has a good box office success in her cinema career.  In 2006, she acted in the movie Hayatımın Kadınısın for which she won the  Sadri Alışık award. In 2019 Mola acted as the Queen of Hearts in a Musical adaption based on the Alice in Wonderland by Lewis Carroll.

Controversy
In August 2020, Mola criticized a Turkish soldier, Musa Orhan, who was released from prison, despite being accused of sexual assault in Siirt, and whose Kurdish victim, İpek Er, died in hospital. In June 2021, both Orhan's lawyer and the office of the chief public prosecutor filed a lawsuit against Mola on charges of 'insulting with an audio, written and video message', demanding a prison sentence of up to 2 years and 4 months. In May 2022, she was fined over 400 dollars for insulting Orhan.

Filmography

Film

Tv Theatre

Web series

Tv Series

References

External links
 
 

1983 births
Living people
Actresses from Istanbul
Turkish film actresses
Turkish television actresses
Turkish stage actresses